Radner is an English or German surname. Notable people with the surname include:

David Radner (1848–1901), Lithuanian Jewish translator
Gilda Radner (1946–1989), American comedian and actress
Maria Radner (1981–2015), German opera singer and passenger on Germanwings Flight 9525
Roy Radner (1927-2022), American economist and business professor
Sidney Hollis Radner (1919-2011), American magician

See also
Radnor (disambiguation)

German-language surnames